The Wombles are fictional pointy-nosed, furry creatures created by Elisabeth Beresford and originally appearing in a series of children's novels from 1968. They live in burrows, where they aim to help the environment by collecting and recycling rubbish in creative ways. Although Wombles supposedly live in every country in the world, Beresford's stories are primarily concerned with the lives of the inhabitants of the burrow on Wimbledon Common in London, England.

The characters gained a higher national profile in the UK in the mid-1970s as a result of the popularity of a BBC-commissioned children's television show which used stop-motion animation. A number of spin-off novelty songs also became hits in the British music charts. The Wombles pop group was the idea of British singer and composer Mike Batt.

The Womble motto is "Make Good Use of Bad Rubbish". This environmentally friendly message was a reflection of the growing environmental movement of the 1970s.

Background
Elisabeth Beresford took her young children for a Boxing Day walk on Wimbledon Common, where her daughter Kate repeatedly mispronounced it as "Wombledon Common" ("Ma, isn't it great on Wombledon Common?"), sparking the idea of the Wombles in her mother's mind. On getting home, Beresford wrote down the idea and started developing the characters and storylines. She developed most of her Womble characters around members of her family, and named them after places the family had associations with.

Plot aspects

Physical characteristics 
Wombles are essentially burrowing animals. Beresford's original book describes them as "a bit like teddy bears to look at but they have real claws and live beneath Wimbledon Common". As they mostly live in long-established burrows, they rarely use their claws even for digging. Their size and physical appearance has changed somewhat over the years: in the original editions of the books, Wombles are pictured as bear-like and between 3 and 5 feet (about 1–1.5 metres) in height, making them only slightly smaller than adult humans. This changed with the TV series, in which they were portrayed as being about knee-high to humans, with pointy snouts like those of hedgehogs. In the book and film Wombling Free they are described as "short, fat, and furry", roughly between three or four feet (about 1 metre) in height.

Wombles are herbivores and are very fond of mushrooms. They eat a variety of plants, fungi, and tree products that human beings cannot (or will not) eat, so daisy buns, moss pie, acorn juice, fir-cone soufflé, elm bark casserole and grass bread sandwiches are part of the Womble menu – augmented by any food left behind on the Common by human beings. All Wombles are strong swimmers and can even survive for long periods in ice-cold water. Several sub-species of Womble are revealed throughout the books: the Loch Ness Monster is actually part of a clan of water Wombles and the yeti of the Himalayas are giant snow-white Wombles. Wombles have a sixth sense which allows them to sense green spaces and wildlife: this is first mentioned in the Wandering Wombles but developed to a keen long-range telepathic sense by Dalai Gartok Womble in The Wombles Go Round The World.

Wombles are long-lived. In The Wombles, Great Uncle Bulgaria recalls being "a young Womble" at the time of Queen Victoria's coronation in 1837. In the feature-length special World Wide Womble Day Great Uncle Bulgaria's 300th birthday is celebrated.

Culture and society 
Though it is stated that Wombles live all around the world, Beresford's collection of stories, as well as the television series and the music, focus on a group living in Wimbledon Common in London, England, with the sole exception of The Wombles Go Round The World.

Wombles care for and educate their young at a communal level. As with human children, immature Wombles are taught reading, writing and athletic skills, which they learn by playing a game called "Wombles and Ladders". Some older Wombles play this game too, though most regard it as childish. Below a certain (unspecified) age, all Wombles are nameless; upon being deemed to be of working age, a Womble chooses his or her name by looking through Great Uncle Bulgaria's large atlas until they find a name that suits them. Some, Bungo for example, "merely shut their eyes tight and point and hope for the best". They then leave Miss Adelaide's "Womblegarten" and join in the communal work of the burrow, which is mostly clearing up and recycling human refuse.

Wombles are very careful to keep their existence secret from human beings – at least in the books and TV series – fearing that discovery of their existence will lead to the Great Womble Hunt. For the most part, adult human beings rarely take notice of them, or fail to distinguish them from humans. In the film Wombling Free this is reversed as the Wombles seek to get humans to listen to their pleas to "make good use of bad rubbish".

Wombles generally have a low opinion of other animal species, though they are never unkind to them. They have a poor opinion of humans in general, though there are exceptions, such 
as royalty, especially the Queen. They also have a respect for human literature; the Wimbledon Wombles maintain a large library of books left by humans on the Common, and Great Uncle Bulgaria is fond of reading The Times.

Production

Children's novels 
There were five novels and a short story collection:
 The Wombles (1968)
 The Wandering Wombles (1970)
 The Wombles at Work (1973)
 The Invisible Womble and Other Stories (1973)
 The Wombles to the Rescue (1974)
 The Wombles Go Round the World (1976)

All of these were out of print for many years until they were republished by Bloomsbury, from 2010 to 2011, along with the 1973 short-story collection The Invisible Womble, with all-new illustrations by Nick Price.  In The Wandering Wombles, the setting moved from Wimbledon Common to Hyde Park in central London, but The Wombles to the Rescue saw them return to Wimbledon Common.

Four of the books were illustrated by Margaret Gordon. The Wombles at Work (1973) was illustrated by Barry Leith, who worked on set design for the original FilmFair series. The appearance of the Wombles in the books followed the design of the Ivor Wood TV puppets, with the exception of original editions of The Wombles (1968) and first printings of The Wandering Wombles, which preceded the TV series and depicted the Wombles as teddy bear-like creatures. When the 1973 animated Wombles series was in pre-production, a decision was made to change the design of the characters so that they did not resemble teddy bears, as it was felt that there were too many children's shows with teddy bear characters. There is a reference in the first book to dark brown being the colour of their fur (with the exception of the oldest Wombles whose fur turns white) but this was changed to silvery grey, save for the neck, which is black. Some of the toys and book illustrations do not show the black fur on the neck.

There is an audiobook of The Wombles, narrated by Bernard Cribbins.

Beresford wrote a collection of short stories entitled The Invisible Womble and Other Stories (1973); these stories were based on episodes from the TV series, although they occasionally refer to events in the novels.

In addition to these books, many annuals, picture books and children's early readers have been published over the years, some of which were also written by Beresford.

Television 

A stop-motion animated series of five-minute episodes was made between 1973 and 1975, along with two half-hour specials. Narration and all Womble voices for these were provided by Bernard Cribbins.

Further animated episodes, using new animation models and sets, were made by Cinar/Filmfair in 1998–1999. These were ten minutes long and had several Canadian actors provide the voices. Background music was adapted from the Wombles' records along with new compositions.

A CGI animated series of 52 episodes, under the guidance of Mike Batt's Dramatico Productions, who bought the rights to The Wombles for Channel 5's preschool slot Milkshake!, was intended for airing in 2015. Ray Winstone and Cribbins were confirmed as the voices of this new series. Only two of the planned episodes were screened, however, at the Cambridge Film Festival in November 2016. Batt filed for bankruptcy the following year in September, and resigned as director of Dramatico Productions.

Music 

Songwriter and producer Mike Batt wrote the series' theme tune, but negotiated the musical rights to the characters in place of the traditional composer's fee. In an effort to promote the Wombles' first single, he had his mother make him a Womble costume, which he wore for most of the working week. After the Wombles' first chart hit, he went on to perform and produce a number of successful novelty singles as The Wombles in the 1970s. They amassed eight Top 40 singles in the UK and reached No. 55 on the US Billboard Hot 100 chart with 1974's, "Wombling Summer Party" single on Columbia Records. They were awarded the Music Week Award for Top Singles Band of 1974. Reissues of the Wombles' music in the late 1990s and early 2000s also charted, extending their number of UK chart hits to thirteen.

Merchandise 
Stop-motion animation is an expensive means of making a programme, due to the amount of time required. Animation production houses used to rely on international sales of their productions to cover costs, and merchandising was once considered a welcome bonus. Rising labour and production costs, however, have made merchandising a necessary revenue stream for any new programme. The Wombles TV series had originally been commissioned because of the popularity of the stories on UK children's TV programme Jackanory, with little thought given to merchandising, so the Wombles' initial merchandising was conducted in a haphazard way. Following the overwhelming success of merchandising for the Star Wars franchise, merchandising became the prime driver of and precursor to new productions. Prior to Star Wars, the story had come first and its popularity led to the commissioning of a TV series, followed by merchandise. After Star Wars, the situation reversed itself, and toy design came first. Demand for Wombles merchandise in the UK was driven by the popularity of the TV programme and books, but there were restrictions on toy advertising in the UK that kept TV merchandising in check.

The Wombles were merchandised in the UK, Australia, and New Zealand. Products include stuffed toys along with stationery, stickers, small figurines, bath soap, night lights, lamp shades, chocolate bars, gelatin pudding kits, posters, games, shirts, badges (buttons), cloth patches, and other items. The revival of the series in the late 1990s brought with it another wave of merchandise which included lunch boxes, umbrellas, flannels (face cloths), hot water bottle covers, slippers, a Steiff doll, and a set of postage stamps for Alderney, a Channel Island that served as the name for one of the Wombles and the home of Beresford until her death. More recently, the Wombles were part of a set of UK postage stamps honouring classic British children's TV programmes. In 2013, Mike Batt and Elisabeth Beresford's two children consolidated the merchandising copyrights to the Wombles in a new company, Wombles Copyright Holdings, of which Batt became the principal shareholder with creative control held by Beresford's heirs. This included the purchase of the Wombles TV series from DHX Media, who had acquired it with their purchase of Cookie Jar Entertainment in 2012.

Film 

A feature-length live-action movie Wombling Free was released in 1977, written and directed by Lionel Jeffries and starring The Wombles, David Tomlinson, Frances de la Tour and Bonnie Langford. A soundtrack album was released in 1978. A region 2 DVD of the film was released by Network in 2006, containing the film in its theatrical aspect ratio, the original theatrical trailer, and archive interviews with Jeffries, Tomlinson and Langford.

Other appearances 
A feral pack of Wombles appeared in BBC comedy series The Goodies in the episode "The Goodies Rule – O.K.?", engaging in a fierce wrestling match with Bill Oddie.

In 2011, The Wombles performed live at Glastonbury.

The Wombles were the interval entertainment at Eurovision Song Contest 1974.

Sport 

Due to the Wombles' association with the area, some local sporting teams representing Wimbledon are sometimes affectionately nicknamed "the Wombles". These teams include the Ladies side of Wimbledon RFC, whose mascot is "Alderney", the Wimbledon Volleyball Club, and the Wombles Netball Club.

From 2000 to June 2003, Wimbledon F.C. used a Womble named "Wandle" as a club mascot, named after the local River Wandle. After the 2002 relocation of the club to Milton Keynes, the licence to use the character was not renewed beyond June 2003. In 2006, the club's Wimbledon successor, AFC Wimbledon, made a licensing deal with Beresford and launched its own Womble mascot. After a naming competition in which the final name was chosen by Elisabeth Beresford herself, AFC Wimbledon announced that the new Womble would be known as "Haydon", after Haydons Road, the nearest railway station to Wimbledon's original home ground, Plough Lane. Twelve years later, the club announced plans to return to their original neighbourhood; Haydons Road is also the closest station to their new ground.

Beresford also gave permission for a team of Wombles to run the London Marathon.

Characters 

 Great Uncle Bulgaria Coburg – the oldest and wisest of the Wimbledon Wombles and their leader. He is based on Beresford's father-in-law and named after the country and the German city, respectively. He occasionally frightens the younger Wombles with his stern demeanour (and particularly his habit of glaring at them through two pairs of spectacles) but is actually very kind. He is over 300 years old by the final book.
 Tobermory – an engineer, based on Beresford's brother, a skilled inventor, and named after the capital of the Isle of Mull, in the Scottish Inner Hebrides. He has a gruff and surly manner but like Bulgaria (with whom he has been friends for many years) he has a very kindly heart. 
 Orinoco – a shirker who loves sleep and food, styled on Beresford's teenage son and named after the river in South America. Though lazy and slothful by nature, Orinoco is resourceful and always means well, and is capable of some surprising acts of moral and physical courage.
 Bungo – over-enthusiastic and bossy, named after the province of Bungo in Japan. He is Orinoco's best friend and based on Beresford's daughter.
 Tomsk – an athletic but rather dim Womble, named after the city of Tomsk in Russia. He acts as the official "Nightwatch Womble" (and Daywatch Womble on occasion). He is an extremely keen golf player, and plays on the London Scottish Golf Club course situated on the common, where human visitors have occasionally noted his talent for the sport. He is the largest and strongest of the Wimbledon Wombles.
 Wellington – scientifically inclined, but very insecure and absent-minded. Named after Beresford's nephew's school, Wellington School, Somerset, though Wellington himself later states that he chose his name from the city of Wellington in New Zealand.
 Madame Cholet – a very kind-hearted but short-tempered female Womble, and the cook of the Wimbledon burrow, styled on Beresford's mother and named after the town of Cholet in France. She affects a French accent, though she is actually no more French than any other Wimbledon Womble and simply likes to think of herself as French. 
 Alderney – Madame Cholet's assistant, named after Alderney in the Channel Islands where Beresford lived towards the end of her life. She appeared in the early books, but was not in the first TV series. Her character was revived in the second TV series. She is a precocious young Womble with a slight disregard for the rules. 

Later character names for the film Wombling Free and second Wombles TV series were developed in the same manner:

 Cousin Cairngorm McWomble the Terrible – named after the Cairngorms, a mountain range in Scotland. He was introduced in the second book (The Wandering Wombles) as an incredibly fierce Highland Womble clan chief. As his name suggests, he considers himself very formidable, but it is later proved that "his talk is worse than his claws". He appeared in the TV series when he visited the Wimbledon burrow. 
 Shansi – named after the province of Shansi in China, she came to the Wimbledon burrow on an exchange from China, and is often paired with Alderney, as Bungo was with Orinoco. She is a shy and quiet womble who is much happier with Miss Adelaide in the Womblegarten than anywhere else, and has a decided talent for art.
 Stepney – an East Ender with dreadlocks, who got his name from the part of London that he came from. Created for television.
 Obidos – named after the town of Óbidos in Brazil. Created for television.

Some other characters were detailed in the books but never appeared in the television series:

 Miss Adelaide – the burrow's schoolmistress and head of the Womblegarten and a great friend of Madame Cholet, named after the city of Adelaide in Australia. A very strict but fair Womble, she has the ability to make even Great Uncle Bulgaria feel silly.
 Cousin Yellowstone Boston – named after Yellowstone National Park and Boston. Cousin Yellowstone originally appeared in the first book when he visited the Wimbledon Wombles, where he grew up, and was subsequently revealed to be one of the only Wombles noticed by a human, resulting in what became known as "The Great Kidnapping of 1915", when Yellowstone boarded a boat from Britain after being chased by police, and travelled through most of the world, meeting other Womble tribes and nearly starving to death in Canada before finally arriving in America. He says that he always meant to return to Wimbledon, but ended up settling into his life in America more than he had imagined, later becoming the patriarch of the tribe of American Wombles in Yellowstone Park. He is roughly the same age as Tobermory, and introduced the Wimbledon Wombles to American novelties such as a deep freeze. Though he still loves his original home, he considers the States "a great country if you're a Womble". 
 Cousin Botany – named after Botany Bay in Australia. He does not make an appearance until the fifth book (The Wombles to the Rescue), and at first was a quiet and surly Womble who has been living alone in the Wimbledon burrow before the Wombles' return to it. He does not have an active role until Tomsk and Wellington attempt to draw out oil from the bottom of Queen's Mere, when it is discovered that he had been attempting to grow water-plants there as a sustainable food source for the burrow. He is furious with them for destroying his plants until an alternative is offered, and he spent the rest of the books tending to his water-plants in new specialised tanks in the back of the burrow.
 Great-Great-Great Uncle Hapsburg von Hohenzollern – named after two German royal houses. He is the leader of the Black Forest Wombles, and is arguably the most famous Womble in the world, though he likes to keep himself and his Womble clan to themselves. He is also one of the oldest Wombles alive, referring to Great Uncle Bulgaria as "Young Bulgaria". His Wombles are noted to be some of the most skilled with their rubbish, as he has more beautiful furniture in his burrow than almost any other and his cook, Frau Heidelberg, is said to rival even Madame Cholet.
 Great Aunt Thessaly (sometimes Great-Great Aunt Thessaly) – named after the province of Thessaly in Greece. The former leader of the Wombles before Great Uncle Bulgaria, she was noted to be 'very old and very wise', and is known to have taken a young Bulgaria to see the guards of Queen Victoria, and a young Cousin Yellowstone to Wimbledon Tennis Tournament. Her name was occasionally spelt "Thessally" in earlier editions of the first book.

Other characters:
 Nessie – a "Water-Womble", named after the famous Loch Ness in Scotland. Nessie is part of a declining sub-species of aquatic Wombles, a larger breed with webbed paws who prioritise the cleaning of their body of water. In the Womble world, Water-Wombles, specifically Nessie, are the basis for the legend of the Loch Ness Monster, and due to Wombles being a self-contained species, Nessie dislikes the attention surrounding the legend and wishes she were as unknown as the "Land Wombles". Nessie also has two young Water-Womble charges named Ross and Cromarty. All of them are under the protection of the McWomble, and Nessie refers to him as her "best friend".
 Omsk – a Russian womble who came to the Hyde Park burrow via the Russian embassy near Kensington Gardens. He later takes over the burrow in Hyde Park. He is named after the city of Omsk in Russia. 
 Cousin Idaho – Yellowstone's Native American assistant, named after the American state of Idaho.
 Ms Atlanta – the cook of the American burrow, named after the city of Atlanta, Georgia. She holds great respect for Madame Cholet.
 Dalai Gartok – the leader of the "Great White Wombles" of the Himalayas, named after the Tibetan town of Gartok. He and his Wombles inspired the legends of the Yeti. Dalai Gartok is also one of the oldest known Wombles, and has honed his Womble senses to the extent that he has considerable telepathic ability.
 Great-Great Aunt Matilda Murrumbidgee – the leader of the New South Wales Wombles, named after Murrumbidgee River in Australia. She is very fierce and irritable, though Tomsk manages to stand up to her.
 Cairns and Perth – named after the respective cities in Australia and inhabitants of the Australian Burrow.
 Eucula – "cook-in-chief" of the Australian burrow, named after the easternmost town in Western Australia.
 Honourable Cousin Tokyo – the quiet and dignified leader of the Japanese Wombles, named after the capital of Japan.
 Hirado – the "Workshop Master" of the Japanese burrow, named after the city of Hirado, Nagasaki.
 Quetta – a womble whom Yellowstone met while travelling the world, who comes from a burrow on the Khyber Pass. Quetta is named after the capital of Balochistan. 
 Chieftain Fashven – the oldest of the Womble clan leaders in Scotland, and the last to be able to speak Womble Gaelic. The character is named after Fashven Hill in the far north of Scotland.
 Nanking – a Womble in a secretive Chinese community in San Francisco's Chinatown, named after the city in China.
 Tante Lille – the leader of "Les Wombleaux of Boulogne", named after the northern French town of Lille.
 Cousin Van Amsterdam – the leader of a group of Dutch Wombles, named after the capital of Holland.
 Onkel Bonn – the leader of a group of German Wombles, named after Bonn.
 Uncle Dunedin – the leader of the New Zealand Wombles, named after Dunedin.

In the first book, Bungo is the youngest and least experienced of the team, and the story is mostly viewed through his eyes. Later Wellington (who was not introduced until the second book) took over the role of "new boy", and even later on, Shansi takes Bungo's place as the youngest working Womble. Alderney and Miss Adelaide appeared in the earlier books but were not included in the original 1970s TV series. Alderney was re-introduced in the later TV shows produced in the 1990s (the Channel Island of Alderney was actually Elisabeth Beresford's home at the time), along with Stepney (who appeared in none of the earlier versions).

Parodies 
The Wombles are parodied (as Rumbles - haughty, rat-like creatures that can't pronounce their 'R's) in Michael de Larrabeiti's novel The Borribles.

References

External links 
 Tidy Bag – Remembering the Wombles
 The Official Wombles Website
 Obituary for Elisabeth Beresford, and Mike Batt's connections with the Wombles (at the Internet Archive)

 
Association football mascots
Fictional anthropomorphic characters
Fictional people from London
Literary characters introduced in 1968
Series of children's books